Rana sangzhiensis is a species of frog in the family Ranidae, the "true frogs". It is endemic to China. It is known only from Mount Tianping, in Sangzhi County, Hunan (its type locality), and depending on the source, from Mount Dadong in Lianxian County, Guangdong, or from Mount Emei in Sichuan. Common names Sangzhi frog and Sangzhi groove-toed frog has been proposed for it. It was formerly classified in the genus Pseudorana.

Rana sangzhiensis occurs in hilly forest areas near streams. Breeding takes place in streams. It is a rare species. One population occurs within Badagongshan National Nature Reserve.

References

Rana (genus)
Frogs of China
Endemic fauna of China
Amphibians described in 1986
Taxonomy articles created by Polbot